Cakraningrat IV was a ruling prince (1718-1745) from West Madura, and a member of the Cakraningrat dynasty which was the subordinate ruler of the Mataram Sultanate.

During his reign, he tried to expand his authority to include all Madura Island and East Java region. He alternated alliances with Mataram and the Dutch East India Company, and even separately battled the two forces in an effort to realize his goal. However, in 1746 he lost the final war against Mataram which then had allied with the Company, and he was later banished to the Cape of Good Hope until his death.

From then on, the West Madura region was ceded over by Mataram to the Dutch East India Company as an exchange for the costs of the war. His son, Cakraningrat V, was put in his place as the Company's vassal.

See also 
 Java War (1741–1743)

References 

People from Madura Island
Indonesian royalty
South African people of Indonesian descent